PFF may refer to:

Entertainment
 Prishtina International Film Festival, Kosovo
 Pinoy Fear Factor, Philippines' Fear Factor Franchise
 Portable Film Festival, an online film festival

Military history
 The Pathfinder Force, the World War II target-marking bomber group
 Palestine Final Fortress, the World War II British defense plan for Mandatory Palestine in 1942

Sports
 Pakistan Football Federation, the main football association in Pakistan
 Philippine Football Federation, the main football association in the Philippines
 Pro Football Focus, a website devoted to analysis of the National Football League

Other
 Partei für Freiheit und Fortschritt, the Belgian liberal party in the East Cantons
 Parafluorofentanyl, a synthetic opioid
 Acroynym for Probationary Firefighter